Jake Silbermann (born on June 1, 1983) is an American actor, writer and producer.

Biography 
Silbermann was born June 1, 1983, and is a native of New York City. He graduated with a Bachelor of Arts in theater from Syracuse University, where he participated in many productions including Piñata, Three Sisters and True West. He played a leading role in the 2006 film, Brunch of the Living Dead.

The actor joined the cast of As the World Turns in March 2007 and attended the GLAAD Media Awards with co-stars Van Hansis and Jennifer Landon two months before he even aired. His on-air debut was on June 1, 2007, in the role of Noah Mayer. Noah's romance with Luke Snyder (Van Hansis) was featured on Entertainment Tonight.

Despite the fact that Silbermann identifies as straight, when asked if he was worried about playing gay in his first high-profile gig, Silbermann responded: "I didn't hesitate for a second."

Prior to joining the cast of As the World Turns, he appeared in a national television ad campaign for Gillette Fusion Power.

Career

As the World Turns
Silbermann joined the CBS soap opera As the World Turns as Noah Mayer, on June 1, 2007, which was also his 24th birthday. With Luke Snyder (played by Van Hansis), Silbermann's character was part of a pairing hailed as the first gay male soap opera supercouple despite controversy about their storyline.

Primetime appearances
On April 28, 2008, Silbermann appeared on an episode of Gossip Girl, "Desperately Seeking Serena".

On April 29, 2012, he appeared on an episode of The Good Wife, "Affairs of State" as Jared Buck, a college wrestler whose ex-girlfriend has been raped.

On November 18, 2014, he appeared on an episode of Person of Interest, "Point of Origin" under the role of Phil Cain, a young officer of the NYPD.

On December 5, 2018, he appeared on episodes five and six of The Marvelous Mrs. Maisel, "Midnight at the Concord" and "Let's face the music and dance" as Marv Feinberg.

On February 11, 2019, he appeared on an episode of Bull, "Leave it All Behind" as Chris Fields.

Commercials and modeling

Jake Silbermann made his debut on a television commercial for Gillette in the 2006 "Gillette Fusion Power" commercial that was featured internationally.

Silbermann has appeared in a 2010 AT&T commercial. Silbermann is signed with Robyn Ziegler Management, DNA Model Management in New York City.

He has also appeared in a 2011 Canon commercial, the Canon Cinema EOS "Coffee Shop".

In December 2016, Jake co-starred in a commercial for the BMW brand that was directed by Elle Ginter, called "Retrospect".

Filmography
 Brunch of the Living Dead (2006) as Jeff
 Goodnight Elizabeth (2010) as Brad
 Stuffer (2010) as Haken
 Let Me Make You a Martyr (2016) as Lamen
 Pain and Suffering: A Legal Comedy (2017) as Lenny Rosen
 Twelve (2019) as Coach Lynch
 The Report (2019) as Yoked Up CIA Officer
 'The Atlantic City Story (2020) as Michael

Theatre
 Dracula (2010) as Jonathan Harker, Off-Broadway production at the Little Shubert Theater directed by Paul Alexander.
 Phaedra Backwards (2011) as Hippolytus, Off-Broadway production at The McCarter Theatre by Marina Carr.
 Derby Day (2011) as Johnny Ballard, Off-Broadway production at CTC by Samuel Brett Williams.
 3C (2012) as Brad, Off-Off-Broadway production at the Rattlestick by David Adjmi.
 Marie Antoinette (2012) as Axel Von Fersen, Off-Broadway production at the A.R.T./Yale Rep by David Adjmi.
 The Assembled Parties (2013) as Scotty/Tim Bascov, Broadway production at the Manhatthan theatre Club by Richard Greenberg.
 Derby Day (2014), a reprise of the show previously debuted in 2011 on NY but in the city of Los Angeles at the Elephant Theatre.
 Picasso at the Lapin Agile (2014) as The Visitor, Off-Broadway production at the Long Warf Theatre by Steve Martin.

Interesting facts
 Jake Silbermann made his tv debut on the daytime soap opera Guiding Light as Porter in April 2007.
 Silbermann produced and wrote the script for Stuffer, a short film that was shown at 22 film festivals throughout America and won 5 awards.
 In 2011, he co-funded his own theatre production company "The Camisade Theatre Company" which produced his first play Derby Day.
 In April 2013, he made his Broadway acting debut in Richard Greenberg's play, The Assembled Parties.
 Silbermann was committed to make a full-length film about homophobia in the South by Samuel Brett Williams, The Revival, based on the Off-Broadway production. The last day of shooting was in December 2015. Jake was involved during the whole process even though he is no longer part of the cast and neither is the Camisade Theatre Company.
 In 2016, he co-wrote a short film called Consciousness with his good friend Nathan Crooker, who directed his first short film Stuffer.
 Jake is also involved in two more projects with his pal Nathan Crooker: Midnight Delivery, a horror/suspense short film that premiered on Dances with Films festival in June 2018 and Lucas, another short film.
 He provided the voice and motion capture of Captain Lyndon Monroe in the video game Red Dead Redemption 2 that was released in October 2018.

References

External links
 
 
 
 AfterElton.com Interview with Jake Silbermann
  (Fan Account)

1983 births
American male soap opera actors
Living people
Syracuse University alumni